Gordon Eric Peter Sweetzer (born 27 January 1957) is a Canadian former professional soccer player who played as a forward. In a short, injury-plagued career, he played in the Football League for Brentford, Cambridge United and in the North American Soccer League for Toronto Blizzard and Edmonton Drillers. Sweetzer won three caps for Canada and later became a manager and coach. As a player, he was described as "an aggressive, all-action, bustling striker, with little finesse about his game".

Club career

Brentford (1975–1978) 
A forward, Sweetzer began his career in the youth system at Queens Park Rangers, before transferring to Fourth Division club Brentford in July 1975. After signing a professional contract in September 1975, he was named as the substitute for a league fixture versus Huddersfield Town late in the month. Aged 18, Sweetzer made his professional debut when he replaced Dave Simmons during the match and scored the first senior goal of his career with a late header in the 2–1 defeat. He went on to establish himself in the team and finished the 1975–76 season with 31 appearances and seven goals.

Sweetzer began the 1976–77 season with niggling injuries, but after returning to fitness he showed prolific form, scoring 23 goals in 28 appearances to pull the Bees away from what would have been an almost-certain re-election scenario. He was voted the club's Supporters' Player of the Year. During the 1977–78 season, Sweetzer was part of a prolific forward line that also included Steve Phillips and Andrew McCulloch and despite being affected by injuries, he scored 14 goals in 20 appearances. With promotion to the Third Division almost assured, he was transferred out of the club in April 1978. In just shy of three seasons at Griffin Park, Sweetzer scored 44 goals in 79 appearances.

Later career (1978–1982) 
Sweetzer transferred to high-flying Third Division club Cambridge United for a £30,000 fee in April 1978, a move which reunited him with manager John Docherty, who had signed him at Brentford. Sweetzer celebrated promotion to the Second Division with the club at the end of the 1977–78 season, but the remainder of his spell would be plagued by injuries and he left the club in 1980. He returned to his native Canada to play for North American Soccer League club Toronto Blizzard in 1980 and 1981, before closing out his career in 1982 with a short comeback at Brentford and a spell with North American Soccer League club Edmonton Drillers.

International career 
Sweetzer won four caps for Canada in 1981.

Managerial and coaching career 
Sweetzer served as manager at Isthmian League Premier Division club Staines Town between November 1990 and June 1991. He is currently a youth coach at Toronto High Park.

Personal life 
Sweetzer's brothers Billy and Jimmy also played professional football.

Honours 
Brentford
 Football League Fourth Division fourth-place promotion: 1977–78

Individual

 Brentford Supporters' Player of the Year: 1976–77

Career statistics

References

External links
 Gordon Sweetzer at canadasoccer.com

1957 births
Living people
Brentford F.C. players
Cambridge United F.C. players
Canada men's international soccer players
Canadian soccer players
Edmonton Drillers (1979–1982) players
Canadian people of English descent
English people of Canadian descent
Association football forwards
North American Soccer League (1968–1984) players
Soccer players from Toronto
People with acquired Canadian citizenship
English Football League players
Toronto Blizzard (1971–1984) players
Canadian expatriate soccer players
Expatriate footballers in England
Staines Town F.C. managers
Isthmian League managers
Canadian expatriate sportspeople in England
Canadian soccer coaches